The 2016 AFC U-16 Championship was the 17th edition of the AFC U-16 Championship, the biennial international youth football championship organised by the Asian Football Confederation (AFC) for the men's under-16 national teams of Asia. The tournament was held in India, as announced by the AFC on 3 June 2015, and was played between 15 September and 2 October 2016. A total of 16 teams played in the tournament.

Same as previous editions, the tournament acted as the AFC qualifiers for the FIFA U-17 World Cup. The top four teams of the tournament qualified for the 2017 FIFA U-17 World Cup also in India as the AFC representatives, besides India who qualified automatically as hosts. If India were among the top four teams, three play-off matches would be played to decide the fifth-placed team which also qualify for the 2017 FIFA U-17 World Cup; however, this was not necessary as India were eliminated in the group stage.

This marked the first time a U-17 World Cup host nation hosts the AFC U-16 Championship.

Iraq won the tournament after beating Iran 4–3 on penalties in the final match.

Qualification

The draw for the qualifiers was held on 5 June 2015. A total of 45 teams were drawn into eleven groups, with the eleven group winners and the four best runners-up qualifying for the final tournament, together with India who qualified automatically as hosts but also competed in the qualifying stage.

The qualifiers were played between 12–20 September 2015, except for Group H which were played between 2–6 September 2015.

Qualified teams
The following 16 teams qualified for the final tournament. Nepal were replaced by Kyrgyzstan due to one of their players failing an MRI bone test.

On 12 April 2016, the AFC Competitions Committee decided that if the FIFA suspension of the Kuwait Football Association was not lifted by 13 May 2016, the next highest ranked team in the AFC U-16 Championship qualifying competition would replace Kuwait in the competition.

On 13 May 2016, the FIFA Congress confirmed the suspension of Kuwait, and asked the FIFA Council to lift the suspension as soon as the necessary requirements are fulfilled. As a result, Kuwait were replaced by Yemen, the next highest ranked team in the AFC U-16 Championship qualifying competition.

Venues
The tournament is played in two venues:

Draw
The draw for the final tournament was held on 26 May 2016, 15:00 IST (UTC+5:30), in Goa (postponed from 4 May 2016). The 16 teams were drawn into four groups of four teams. The teams were seeded according to their performance in the previous edition in 2014.

Group stage
The top two teams of each group advance to the quarter-finals.

Tiebreakers
The teams are ranked according to points (3 points for a win, 1 point for a draw, 0 points for a loss). If tied on points, tiebreakers are applied in the following order:
Greater number of points obtained in the group matches between the teams concerned;
Goal difference resulting from the group matches between the teams concerned;
Greater number of goals scored in the group matches between the teams concerned;
If, after applying criteria 1 to 3, teams still have an equal ranking, criteria 1 to 3 are reapplied exclusively to the matches between the teams in question to determine their final rankings. If this procedure does not lead to a decision, criteria 5 to 9 apply;
Goal difference in all the group matches;
Greater number of goals scored in all the group matches;
Penalty shoot-out if only two teams are involved and they are both on the field of play;
Fewer score calculated according to the number of yellow and red cards received in the group matches (1 point for a single yellow card, 3 points for a red card as a consequence of two yellow cards, 3 points for a direct red card, 4 points for a yellow card followed by a direct red card);
Drawing of lots.

All times are local, IST (UTC+5:30).

Group A

Group B

Group C

Group D

Knockout stage
In the knockout stage, penalty shoot-out is used to decide the winner if necessary (extra time is not used).

Bracket

Quarter-finals
Winners qualify for 2017 FIFA U-17 World Cup.

Semi-finals

Final

Winners

Awards
Most Valuable Player
 Mohammed Dawood

Top Scorer
 Mohammed Dawood

Fair Play

Goalscorers
6 goals

 Mohammed Dawood

4 goals

 Takefusa Kubo
 Akito Tanahashi
 Kye Tam

3 goals

 Alireza Asadabadi
 Allahyar Sayyadmanesh
 Mohammad Sharifi
 Mohammad Ghaderi
 Hiroto Yamada
 Arshad Al-Alawi
 Kim Pom-hyok
 Rasul Yuldoshov

2 goals

 John Roberts
 Muntadher Mohammed
 Shimpei Fukuoka
 Soichiro Kozuki
 Taisei Miyashiro
 Keito Nakamura
 Ri Kang-guk
 Firas Al-Buraikan
 Arnon Prasongporn
 Ahmad Fawzi
 Nguyễn Hữu Thắng

1 goal

 Aman Chetri
 Aniket Jadhav
 Sanjeev Stalin
 Boris Singh Thangjam
 Suresh Singh Wangjam
 Amir Hossein Khodamoradi
 Mohammed Ridha Jalil
 Muntadher Abdulsada
 Takuma Kemmotsu
 Nagi Matsumoto
 Gijo Sehata
 Ayumu Seko
 Toichi Suzuki
 Dhari Al-Anazi
 Mansor Al Beshe
 Abdulaziz Al-Dhuwayhi
 Nawaf Al-Duraywish
 Adilet Kanybekov
 Gulzhigit Alykulov
 Cheon Seong-Hoon
 Jeong Chan-young
 Ko Jun-Hee
 Park Jeong-in
 Aliff Haiqal
 Muadh Al Jahdhami
 Yousuf Al Malki
 Jinnawat Russamee
 Natthaphon Srisawat
 Hassawat Nopnate
 Abdullah Al Naqbi
 Abed Alazez Dawod
 Ali Khamis
 Majed Rashed
 Manea Aydh
 Ibrokhim Ganikhonov
 Abubakir Muydinov
 Mardon Abdullaev
 Asadbek Sobirjonov
 Jasurbek Umrzakov
 Nguyễn Duy Khiêm
 Nguyễn Khắc Khiêm
 Nguyễn Trần Việt Cường

1 own goal

 Maksat Dzhakybaliev (against Vietnam)
 Wudtichai Kumkeam (against Uzbekistan)
 Hassawat Nopnate (against Yemen)

Tournament ranking

Qualified teams for FIFA U-17 World Cup
The following five teams from AFC qualified for the 2017 FIFA U-17 World Cup, including India which qualified as hosts.

1 Bold indicates champion for that year. Italic indicates host for that year.

Ban on North Korean manager and goalkeeper
On 4 November 2016, the AFC announced that North Korean manager Yung Jong-su and goalkeeper Jang Paek-ho were banned for a year for bringing the game into disrepute following the deliberate conceding of a goal during their final group match against Uzbekistan. The goal in question was conceded in the 49th minute, which Jang appeared to duck out of the way of a direct kick from the Uzbek goalkeeper. Uzbekistan won the match 3–1 and finished top of the group, meaning they would meet Iraq in the quarter-finals, and they went on to lose. North Korea, as group runners-up, met Oman in the quarter-finals, which they won to qualify for the 2017 FIFA U-17 World Cup. The ban means both Yung and Jang are suspended from the 2017 FIFA U-17 World Cup.

The North Korean team were also placed on a suspended ban from the 2018 AFC U-19 Championship. While they will be allowed to compete in the qualifiers, if the team engage in similar behaviour, they will be automatically ejected from the competition.

References

External links
, the-AFC.com

 
U-16 Championship
2016
2015–16 in Indian football
October 2016 sports events in Asia
September 2016 sports events in Asia
2016 in youth association football
Sport in Goa